Bogdan Straton (born 23 August 1983) is a Romanian footballer who currently plays as a defensive midfielder for Bradul Borca.

Club career

Politehnica Iaşi

In July 2011 Straton joined Politehnica Iași on a two-year deal. At the end of the season, CSMS finished second in table and gained promotion to Liga I, in part due to Straton's performances.

References

External links
 
 

1983 births
Living people
Romanian footballers
CSM Unirea Alba Iulia players
FC Botoșani players
FC Politehnica Iași (1945) players
FC Petrolul Ploiești players
FC Politehnica Iași (2010) players
FCV Farul Constanța players
Widzew Łódź players
Liga I players
Romanian expatriate footballers
Expatriate footballers in Poland
Association football midfielders